The Namibia Economist  is a Namibian newspaper published digitally that focuses on local business and financial topics. It is published exclusively in English, Daniel Steinmann is the editor. First published in 1991 it appeared as a printed monthly newspaper.

Namibia Economist published its last printed edition on 25 November 2016. The web site was established in 2001 and continues.

References

External links
 Official web site

Online publishing
English-language newspapers published in Namibia
Weekly newspapers published in Namibia
Newspapers established in 1996
1996 establishments in Namibia
Finance & Investment articles by quality